Ulodemis hyalura is a species of moth of the family Tortricidae. It is found in Vietnam, Malaysia and Indonesia (Sumatra, Java).

The wingspan is 22–24 mm. The submedian interfascia and transverse fascia are scattered with purple
spots. The posterior half of the wing is fulvous ochreous towards the middle of the termen and suffused with light ferruginous. The hindwings are rather dark fulvous fuscous, with a bronze gloss.

The larvae feed on Camellia sinensis.

References

Moths described in 1983
Archipini